Gwangjin District (Gwangjin-gu) is one of the 25 wards (gu) of Seoul, South Korea. It is located on the north bank of the Han River, to the eastern end of Seoul. It was created from neighboring Seongdong District in 1995.

Gwangjin District is home to Konkuk University and Sejong University.

Characteristics
Gwangjin District is characterized by a remarkable variety in its composition. It is home to the Konkuk University campus, the vicinity of which is one of Seoul's top nightlife destinations, as well as Children's Grand Park, an equally popular attraction for children and families. The south bank overlooking the Han River is a densely packed residential district, where high-rise apartment buildings dominate the skyline, yet the heart and northern end of the district are centers for light industry and manufacturing. The district is also a hub for transportation and mail in and out of Seoul, as the Dong Seoul Bus Terminal and the East-Seoul Postal Service Depot link Seoul with most other major cities in Korea. Most of the remaining area is residential, but consist not of apartment buildings characteristic of the city, but of three or four-story row houses separated by small roads and alleyways.

The Konkuk University area is a popular nightlife district featuring dozens of restaurants, bars, DVD rooms, and pool houses catering to a mostly younger crowd, much like the areas of Sinchon and Hongdae. The area is also a burgeoning shopping district with several boutiques cropping up within the newly designated Rodeo Street and the opening of the Star City mall, which features an E-Mart, a Lotte Cinema, a Burger King, a Krispy Kreme, a large video game arcade and numerous other restaurants and specialty shops.

Adjacent to the Sejong University campus is Children's Grand Park, which features fountains, walking trails, a zoo, and an amusement park.

In the centre of Gwangjin District is Gangbyeon subway station. On the left of the station  is Dong Seoul Bus Terminal, where buses serve various destinations including Busan, Gwangju, Daegu, and Daejeon. To the right of the station is a huge building selling electronics called Techno Mart. A variety of computers, printers, mobile phones, cameras, MP3 players, and even refrigerators are sold in this building, which is a little like Akihabara in Tokyo.

Located in the northeastern section of the District is the Sheraton Grande Walkerhill, managed by the Sheraton Hotels and Resorts and W Seoul Walkerhill Hotel, with one of only three casinos in Seoul.

Administrative divisions

 Gwangjang-dong (광장동 廣壯洞)
 Gunja-dong (군자동 君子洞)
 Guui-dong (구의동 九宜洞)
 Hwayang-dong (화양동 華陽洞)
 Mojin-dong (모진동 毛陳洞) - a beopjeong-dong administered by Hwayang-dong
 Jayang-dong (자양동 紫陽洞)
 Junggok-dong (중곡동 中谷洞)
 Neung-dong (능동 陵洞)
 Noyu-dong (노유동 老遊洞)

Transportation

Railroad
Seoul Metro
Seoul Subway Line 2 Circle Line
(Seongdong-gu) ← Konkuk University — Guui — Gangbyeon → (Songpa-gu)
Seoul Subway Line 5
(Dongdaemun-gu) ← Gunja — Achasan — Gwangnaru → (Gangdong-gu)
Seoul Subway Line 7
(Jungnang-gu) ← Junggok — Gunja — Children's Grand Park — Konkuk University — Ttukseom Resort → (Gangnam-gu)

Education

Primary schools
Sejong University Elementary School(Sejong Elementary School)
Middle schools
Seoul Gwangnam Middle School
High schools
Gwangnam High School
Universities
Sejong University
Konkuk University
Sejong Cyber University
International schools
International Mongolia School
Korea Kent Foreign School

Sister cities
 Boeun, South Korea
 Boryeong, South Korea
 Ereğli, Turkey
 Fangshan, China
 Inje, South Korea
 Mungyeong, South Korea
 Yeonggwang, South Korea

References

External links

 Gwangjin-gu official website in English
 Gwangjin-gu official website in Korean

 
Districts of Seoul